Tomáš Hyka (born 23 March 1993) is a Czech professional ice hockey player who is currently playing for HC Dynamo Pardubice of the Czech Extraliga (ELH). He previously played in the National Hockey League (NHL) with the Vegas Golden Knights.

Playing career
Hyka began his career his hometown team BK Mladá Boleslav and made his debut for the senior team during the 2010-11 Czech Extraliga season. In the 2011–12 NHL preseason, the Philadelphia Flyers invited Hyka to their training camp. Hyka scored a goal in his sole preseason game, before the Flyers discovered that the current Collective Bargaining Agreement did not allow Hyka to be signed by them and released him to his QMJHL team, the Gatineau Olympiques. He was subsequently drafted by the Los Angeles Kings in the 2012 NHL Entry Draft but eventually went unsigned.

In 2013, Hyka moved to Sweden to sign for Färjestad BK of the Elitserien. After one season in Sweden, Hyka returned to Mladá Boleslav.

On 1 June 2017, Hyka was signed by the Vegas Golden Knights to a one-year contract, becoming the third player in their organization's history. Hyka was called up to the NHL from the Chicago Wolves for the first time on 18 December 2017, only to be sent back two days later without making his NHL debut. However, Hyka was recalled again on 19 February 2018 and he made his NHL debut that night against the Anaheim Ducks. He had two shots on net and played 11:37 minutes. Hyka scored his first NHL goal on 23 February 2018 in a game against the Vancouver Canucks.

At the conclusion of his contract with the Golden Knights and unable to cement a full-time role in the NHL, Hyka opted to return to Europe in agreeing to a two-year contract with Russian club, Traktor Chelyabinsk of the KHL on 25 June 2019.

Following three seasons in Russia with Traktor Chelyabinsk, Hyka left as a free agent to return to his homeland in agreeing to a three-year contract with HC Dynamo Pardubice of the ELH on 10 May 2022.

Career statistics

Regular season and playoffs

International

Awards and honours

References

External links

1993 births
Living people
BK Mladá Boleslav players
Chicago Wolves players
Czech ice hockey forwards
Färjestad BK players
Gatineau Olympiques players
Los Angeles Kings draft picks
Sportspeople from Mladá Boleslav
Traktor Chelyabinsk players
VIK Västerås HK players
Vegas Golden Knights players
Ice hockey players at the 2022 Winter Olympics
Olympic ice hockey players of the Czech Republic
Czech expatriate ice hockey players in Canada
Czech expatriate ice hockey players in the United States
Czech expatriate ice hockey players in Sweden
Czech expatriate ice hockey players in Russia